Shelton Jones (born April 4, 1966) is an American former professional basketball player who played collegiately at St. John's University. He was selected by the San Antonio Spurs in the second round (27th pick overall) of the 1988 NBA draft. Shelton played only one year in the NBA, during the 1988-89 season. He split the year between the Spurs, the Golden State Warriors, and the Philadelphia 76ers, for whom he also appeared in the NBA Slam Dunk Contest, finishing in 4th place after advancing to the semi-finals. After the season, he was selected by the Minnesota Timberwolves as the 16th pick in the 1989 NBA expansion draft. After his selection, he said: "I'm a little stunned right now. I thought I'd be taken by Orlando because I'd heard some things. Things like this happen. That's the kind of year I had. I'll make the best of the situation. I look forward to getting out there and meeting with the coach. I don't even know who it is.". As it turned out, the Timberwolves waived him before the season began, and he never played in the NBA again, although he did have a long career playing in various other leagues.

After his playing career, Jones founded the Shelton Jones Foundation, which "trains and mentors student-athletes to become successful in life through sports, community outreach and personal development".

References

External links

1966 births
Living people
American expatriate basketball people in France
American expatriate basketball people in Israel
American expatriate basketball people in Italy
American expatriate basketball people in Mexico
American expatriate basketball people in Spain
American men's basketball players
Basketball players from New York (state)
Club Ourense Baloncesto players
Connecticut Pride players
Florida Beachdogs players
Golden State Warriors players
Great Lakes Storm players
Hapoel Holon players
Israeli Basketball Premier League players
Leones de Ponce basketball players
Liga ACB players
McDonald's High School All-Americans
Minnesota Timberwolves expansion draft picks
Pallacanestro Virtus Roma players
Panteras de Miranda players
People from Amityville, New York
People from Copiague, New York
Philadelphia 76ers players
Rapid City Thrillers players
Reyer Venezia players
San Antonio Spurs draft picks
San Antonio Spurs players
Small forwards
Sportspeople from Suffolk County, New York
St. John's Red Storm men's basketball players
Tulsa Fast Breakers players